The Justice Legion Alpha is a DC Comics superhero team, who exist in the far future of the DC Universe.

Publication history
Created by Grant Morrison, the team first appeared in the final page of JLA #23 (except The Flash, who was created by Mark Waid and first appeared in Flash 50th Anniversary Special (1990)).

Fictional team biography
In the 853rd century the institutions of the Justice League of America (JLA) and the Legion of Super-Heroes have developed into the Justice Legions, various teams of superhumans who act to protect the Milky Way galaxy. The highest ranking of these is the Justice Legion Alpha, who have their base on Jupiter and are responsible for protecting the Solar System (the second rank is Justice Legion Beta, the third is Justice Legion Gamma, and so on).  While Alpha resembles the JLA, other legions resemble teams such as the Teen Titans, Young Justice, the Legion of Super-Heroes, the Legion of Super-Pets, etc.

During the Convergence storyline, the Metropolis of the 853rd Century is among the cities within different domes on Telos. Owlwoman was mentioned to have fallen in battle as Batman tells Superman to hang her picture up on the wall of their fallen comrades. When the domes came down, the Justice Legion ended up engaging the Crime Syndicate in battle which starts with Superman being attacked by Ultraman.

Members
Justice Legion Alpha is made up of future analogs of modern heroes. Their membership includes:
 Superman: The latest in the Superman dynasty that stretches from modern times to the 853rd century. One of the intervening Supermen married a queen from the fifth dimension, granting the succeeding Supermen ten all-new senses. Also, the now god-like original Superman lives in the heart of the Sun and through his immense will, grants even greater powers to his descendants so long as they continue to protect Earth. Superman operates from Earth. His real name may be Kal Kent (All-Star Superman).
 Wonder Woman: A marble statue granted life by the Goddess of Truth. She has similar powers to the original and also carries two shape-changing weapons similar in nature to Diana's invisible jet, which typically act as her sentient bracelets, Charity and Harmony. She operates from Venus.
 Batman: Pluto is now a penal colony. When the current Batman was a child, he lived with his prison-guard parents on Pluto. After a prison break, the prisoners rounded all the guards into a stadium and forced their children to watch as they were gunned down. Remembering the legend of the original Batman, he decided it would take someone of extraordinary will to control the prison and took command himself. He has trained his whole life to become a perfect crime-fighter and also has numerous technological enhancements. His sidekick is a robot called Robin, the Toy Wonder.
 Flash: Originally from the 27th century, the time traveling speedster John Fox had met Wally West, the 20th century Flash, before he wound up in the 853rd century. He operates from Mercury.
 Aquaman: King of the oceanic planet of Neptune. Unlike the original Aquaman, he has a more fish-like appearance, as well as the psionic ability to control water, whether using water molecules in the air or water in the human body.
 Hourman: An android with the memories of Rex Tyler, the original Hourman. He has mastery over time and space made possible by a cosmic artifact, the Worlogog. His home planet is not stated in the story, but would presumably be Saturn.
 Starman: Farris Knight is a direct descendant of Ted Knight, although his specific family only took up the Starman legacy starting with his great-grandfather. He monitors the artificial sun Solaris and lives in a space station that exists where Uranus once was.
 Resurrection Man: Mitch Shelley, still unable to die, has become the team's tactician, replacing the Martian Manhunter (who has now become one with the planet Mars). He has a device on his arm that "kills" him in a controlled manner, letting him die for a second and choose which powers he acquires, though flight, invulnerability and super strength are among his base abilities.
 The Atom: The Atom of the 853rd century is a scientist who was the only survivor of a universe that was suddenly consumed by this one. Instead of simply shrinking himself like other Atoms, he has the power to divide his mass into duplicates of himself, spreading the same amount of matter across increasing numbers of ever-smaller Atoms. When they reach atomic scale, the Atoms can arrange themselves into a wide variety of molecular configurations—becoming anything from a lump of gold to a cloud of gas. His home planet is presumably Jupiter.
 Owlwoman: Little is known about the Owlwoman of the 853rd century except that she is the offspring of a human father and a Qwardian mother and possesses an advanced flight harness that grants her the ability to travel at the speed of light. She first appeared in the DC One Million 80-Page Giant as the JLA's replacement for the recently deceased Starman. Her costume bears a strong resemblance to that of the vigilante Nite Owl from Watchmen.

References

DC Comics superhero teams
Justice League
Justice Society of America
Legion of Super-Heroes